Bulbophyllum lamingtonense, commonly known as the cream rope orchid, is a species of epiphytic or lithophytic orchid with well-spaced pseudobulbs and brown bracts arranged along the stems. Each pseudobulb has a single, fleshy, channelled leaf and a single cream-coloured or white flower with yellow tips. It grows on trees and rocks near cliffs and the edge of rainforest near the eastern border between New South Wales and Queensland.

Description
Flowering occurs from March to August.

Taxonomy and naming
Bulbophyllum lamingtonense was first formally described in 1993 by David Jones who published the description in Phytologia from a specimen collected in the Lamington National Park. The specific epithet (lamingtonense) refers to the type location.

Distribution and habitat
The cream rope orchid grows on trees and rocks near the edge of rainforest or on cliffs in the McPherson and Border Ranges.

References

lamingtonense
Orchids of New South Wales
Orchids of Queensland
Endemic orchids of Australia
Plants described in 1993